NASA space-flown Gemini and Apollo medallions were mission-specific commemorative medallions, often astronaut-designed, which were approved by NASA and carried aboard the mission spacecraft into orbit. Beginning with the first crewed Gemini mission in 1965, commemorative medallions were prepared for the astronauts at their request. These were produced by a company only known as Fliteline and were struck either in a pewter-colored base metal, sometimes painted a gold color, or sterling silver, and were flown on all 10 crewed Gemini missions. A Fliteline medallion was designed and produced for Apollo 1, but was never officially flown after a disastrous cabin fire during a launch rehearsal killed the flight crew.

The Robbins Company of Attleboro, Massachusetts, was contracted in 1968 to produce commemorative medallions beginning with Apollo 7, the first crewed Apollo flight since the Apollo 1 disaster. These were purchased by astronauts and support crew personnel at NASA Astronaut Flight Office, and a total of over 3,000 sterling silver Robbins medallions were flown into space across the 12 crewed flights of the Apollo program. Some of these were later sold in public auction for up to $60,000. The basic elements of the medallion design are consistent throughout the 12 medallions in the series, with the main design element and the mission name on the obverse, mission dates on the reverse,  primary flight crew names on either the obverse or reverse, and a serial number either on the lower reverse or on the rim.  A very small number of Apollo Robbins medallions were also struck in 14k gold, generally ordered by the mission crew as a personal memento. Sterling silver Robbins medallions have continued to be struck for every crewed NASA spaceflight, including Skylab and Space Shuttle missions.

Space-flown numismatic items

Numismatic souvenirs have accompanied astronauts on nearly every early spaceflight. Mercury astronauts carried small light-weight mementos on their missions, often in the form of US coins or banknotes. On the first sub-orbital flight (Mercury-Redstone 3), Alan Shepard carried with him four one-dollar silver certificates which were subsequently signed by him, other Mercury astronauts, and support staff becoming short snorters. John Glenn, piloting the first crewed U.S. orbital spaceflight Mercury-Atlas 6 also carried several one-dollar silver certificates.

Space-flown numismatic items are also known for early Gemini missions. On the first crewed Gemini flight (Gemini 3), Grissom and Young brought 50 two-dollar bills. Young also made history for smuggling "contraband" on board the flight, in the form of a corned-beef sandwich.

Gemini mission space-flown Fliteline medallions
Beginning with the first crewed Gemini mission in March 1965, commemorative medallions were prepared for the astronauts at their request. It is unclear who prepared these early medallions, only that each individual box containing a medallion bore the word "Fliteline". It is unknown how many gold and silver colored medallions were prepared for each mission, and how many were space-flown versus unflown. Fliteline medallions were prepared for each of the crewed Gemini flights, as well as the ill-fated Apollo 1 mission.

Apollo mission space-flown Robbins medallions
The Robbins Company was founded in 1892 by jeweler Charles M. Robbins, in Attleboro, Massachusetts. They began designing and producing commemorative badges for Ohio in 1913, and South Dakota in 1917. In 1935, the first 1,000 badges of a new design for the Federal Bureau of Investigation were produced by Robbins. The Robbins Company also struck the Olympic medals for the 1932 Winter Games in Lake Placid, New York.

Robbins medallions
The Apollo 1 cabin fire in January 1967 put crewed spaceflight on hold. The crew of Apollo 7, designated to be the return to crewed spaceflight, began working with the Robbins Company later in 1967 to produce commemorative mission medallions. Commissioned by the NASA Astronaut Flight Office (AFO), the medallions were financed entirely through the orders placed by astronauts and support crew personnel. Only those directly affiliated with the AFO were eligible as purchasers, and they were bound by their employment contract not to commercialize the medallions, as NASA was concerned about any appearance that the astronauts might profit from the flown medallions.

One (or more) of the astronauts from the flight crew worked directly with the Robbins Company to design the mission medallion. The basic elements of the medallion design are consistent throughout the Project Apollo series. The main design element along with the mission name is located on the obverse. The names of the flight crew can be found on either the obverse or reverse. The mission dates are located on the reverse. Beginning with Apollo 11, special fields were designed for the reverse of the medallion that allowed for engraved dates of launch, lunar landing, and return. Also on the reverse (or sometimes the edge) is the medallion serial number. The size of most Robbins Apollo medallions falls roughly between a current US quarter and a Kennedy half dollar.

The medallions were struck in sterling silver two to three months prior to the scheduled mission, though it is unclear whether serial numbers were added pre or post-flight. The medallions were stored in the Command Service Module during flight and on missions involving a lunar landing, a small number were brought to the lunar surface aboard the Lunar Module. The flown medallions were returned to the Robbins Company after the flight to have the dates engraved and for a final polishing. Except where noted, all medallions struck for Apollo 7–14 were flown, and serial numbers for Apollo 14–17 medallions appear on the rim.

Apollo Robbins medallions were also struck, in very small numbers, in 14k gold. These medallions were generally ordered by the mission crew as a personal memento of their flight and were often taken to the lunar surface in the Landing Module. For the duration of the Apollo program, Robbins medallions (3–7 gold and 80–450 silver per mission) were flown into space.

Robbins Apollo medallions at auction

Despite the NASA prohibition on commercializing the medallions, since 1995 there have been over 500 internet or live auction appearances of Apollo mission Robbins medallions. Two auction companies account for a majority of the sales: Heritage Auctions (over 200 since 2007) and RR Auction (over 100 since 2011). Between both auction companies, the top 10 prices realized range from US$30,000 to nearly $62,000, all for sterling silver medallions from either Apollo 11 or Apollo 17. A gold Robbins medallion from the Apollo 11 mission that belonged to astronaut Neil Armstrong sold for over $2 million in July 2019.

References

Footnotes

Notes

Bibliography

Apollo program
Project Gemini
Human spaceflight programs
Space program of the United States
NASA programs
Exonumia